The flag of the Internal Macedonian Revolutionary Organization was the organization's official flag.  The flag was adopted in the early 1920s by the Central Committee of IMRO. The flag was also the state flag of the proposed puppet state: Independent State of Macedonia. Today the flag is used by right wing political parties in North Macedonia like VMRO-DPMNE and also Bulgarian political parties like VMRO-BND.

Sources 

Flags of organizations
Internal Macedonian Revolutionary Organization